Genoa is a city and port in Liguria, Italy.

Genoa may also refer to:
 The Republic of Genoa, a state in Liguria from ca. 1100 to 1805 with various possessions in the Mediterranean

Places
Australia
 Genoa, Victoria, a town in Australia

United States
 Genoa, Arkansas
 Genoa, Colorado
 Genoa, Illinois
 Genoa, Minnesota
 Genoa, Nebraska
 Genoa, Nevada
 Genoa, New York
 Genoa, Ohio
 Genoa, Stark County, Ohio, now known as Perry Heights, Ohio
 Genoa, Houston
 Genoa, Wisconsin
 Genoa (town), Wisconsin
 Genoa City, Wisconsin
 Genoa Township, DeKalb County, Illinois
 Genoa Township, Michigan
 Genoa Township, Nance County, Nebraska
 Genoa Township, Delaware County, Ohio

Other uses
 Genoa (sail) or jenny, a type of sail named after the city of Genoa
 Genoa cake, a fruit cake
 Genoa C.F.C., an Italian football (soccer) team based in Genoa
 Genoa City (fictional city), the fictitious setting for the American soap opera The Young and the Restless
 Genoa salami
 Genoa Systems, a former manufacturer of graphics adapters
 Epyc Genoa, the code name for a microprocessor sold by AMD
 Project Genoa and Project Genoa II, governmental data analysis projects
 Virginia and Truckee 12 Genoa, a 4-4-0 locomotive used on the Virginia and Truckee Railroad
 Phee Genoa, a treasure hunter in the second season of the animated series Star Wars: The Bad Batch

See also

 
 Genua (disambiguation)
 Guenoa, a people and language of South America
 Genova (disambiguation)
 Génova (disambiguation)
 Geneva (disambiguation)
 Genoese (disambiguation)